John Tapener (fl. 1394) was an English politician. Tapener was a Member of Parliament for Devizes, Wiltshire in 1394. In 1379, he had paid 6d. in poll tax in Devizes. His occupation was then listed as shoemaker.

References

Year of birth missing
Year of death missing
14th-century births
English MPs 1394
People from Devizes
Shoemakers